The Amapá Railway is a former rail line built by Bethlehem Steel to exploit the manganese deposits in the territory of Amapá (now a state), Brazil. The line was also in use for passenger transport.

The rail line stopped transporting ore in 2014, and as of 2020, remains derelict.

See also 
 Rail transport in Brazil

References

Railway lines in Brazil
Standard gauge railways in Brazil
Transport in Amapá

Defunct railroads